Volevčice may refer to:

 Volevčice (Jihlava District), a village in the Czech Republic
 Volevčice (Most District), a village in the Czech Republic